A list of films produced by the Israeli film industry in 1976.

1976 releases

See also
1976 in Israel

References

External links
 Israeli films of 1976 at the Internet Movie Database

Israeli
Film
1976